Wanfang Hospital station is a station on the Brown Line of the Taipei Metro, located in Wenshan District, Taipei, Taiwan.

Station overview

The two-level, elevated station is connected to Wanfang Hospital. It has two side platforms and a single exit.

Station layout

Exits
Single Exit: Xinlong Road, Sec. 4 (Wanfang Hospital)

Around the station
 Wanfang Hospital
 China University of Technology
 Taiwan Police College
 Taipei Municipal Wanfang Senior High School
 Xinghua Elementary School
 Jingfu Community

References

1996 establishments in Taiwan
Railway stations opened in 1996
Wenhu line stations